Tom Naegels (born 14 October 1975, Antwerp) is a Belgian author and journalist.

Naegels' first significant publication was a collection of short stories titled Into the Universe. His novel Los (Loose) was published in 2005 and won the Gerard Walschap prize; the novel was adapted for a film that premiered in September 2008. 
Naegels' most recent book is Arusha.

Naegels' is also a columnist for the Belgian newspaper De Standaard.

References

External links
Official website
Radio Netherlands review of Arusha

Belgian male short story writers
Belgian short story writers
Belgian male novelists
1975 births
Living people
21st-century Belgian novelists
21st-century short story writers
21st-century Belgian male writers